The following list of art deities is arranged by continent with names of mythological figures and deities associated with the arts. Art deities are a form of religious iconography incorporated into artistic compositions by many religions as a dedication to their respective gods and goddesses. The various artworks are used throughout history as a means to gain a deeper connection to a particular deity or as a sign of respect and devotion to the divine being.

Africa and the Middle East

Afroasiatic Middle East

Canaanite 
 Kotar or Kothar-wa-Khasis

Egyptian 
 Bastet 
 Bes 
 Hathor 
 Isis
 Meret
 Ptah
 Seker

Mesopotamian 
 Ishtar
 Nuska

Western Eurasia

Celtic  
Abhean
Brigid
Gwydion

Norse-Germanic 
Bragi
Odin

Greco-Roman

Etruscan 
Menrva

Greek / Hellenic 
 Apollo, god of medicine, music, poetry, song and dance
 Athena, goddess of crafts and handicraft
 Dionysus, god of theatre
 Hephaestus, god of forge and sculpture
 Muses
 Calliope, goddess of epic poetry
 Clio, goddess of history
 Erato, goddess of erotic poetry
 Euterpe, goddess of lyric poetry
 Melpomene, goddess of tragedy
 Polyhymnia, goddess of hymns
 Terpsichore, goddess of dance
 Thalia, goddess of comedy
 Urania, goddess of astronomy

Roman 
Apollo
Minerva

Western Asia

Anatolian - Urarte 
 Arubani

Hindu-Vedic 
 Saraswati
 Hayagriva

Uralic  
Väinämöinen

Asia-Pacific / Oceania

Meitei 

 Khamlangba, associated with smiths
 Khamnung Kikoi Louonbi, associated with enchantment
 Lainaotabi, associated with charm, magic, pottery, sorcery, spell, weaving and witchcraft
 Nongpok Ningthou, associated with dance, music and festival
 Nongthang Leima, associated with enchantment and seduction
 Panthoibi, associated with dance, festival, handicrafts, pottery, spinning and weaving
 Phouoibi, associated with trickery to men
 Pisatao, associated with smiths
 Thangching, associated with divine plays

Far East Asia

Chinese 
 Cao Guojiu, patron god of the theater 
 Han Xiangzi
 Nüwa
 Zhang Guolao, who carries a fish-drum

Japanese 
 Ame-no-Uzume-no-Mikoto
 Benzaiten

Vietnamese 
  Phạm Thị Trân, the founder of Chèo
 Từ Đạo Hạnh, the founder of the art of water puppetry
 Tổ nghề Sân khấu, the three are said to be the founders of theatrical forms of Vietnam

Austronesia

Filipino 

Bait Pandi: the Bagobo goddess of weavers who taught women weaving
Fu Dalu: the T'boli goddess of the abaca; speak and guide weavers on how to create patterns and designs, which are remembered in dreams
Mamiyo: the Ifugao stretcher of skeins, one of the twenty-three deities presiding over the art of weaving
Monlolot: the Ifugao winder of thread on the spindle, one of the twenty-three deities presiding over the art of weaving
Rirryaw Añitu: place spirit Añitus who played music and sang inside a cave in Sabtang, while lighting up fire; believed to have change residences after they were disturbed by a man
Tumungkuyan: leaders of the Salakap from Batak beliefs who paint tree trunks that support the sky using the blood of the epidemic-dead

Polynesian

Hawaiian  
 Lono
 Pele

Native Americas

North America  
 Kokopelli (shared among various Southwestern Native American mythologies)

Mexico

Aztec  
 Huehuecóyotl
 Xochipilli

Haitian Vodou  
 Erzulie
 Maîtresse Délai

References

Art deities
 
Art